Somersby is a semi-rural locality of the Central Coast region of New South Wales, Australia, to the northwest of Gosford along the Pacific Highway. It is part of the  local government area.

Somersby includes sections of the Brisbane Water National Park, within which Somersby Falls are located, as well as the Mount Penang Parklands which are used as a festival and exhibition centre. The Woolshed Function Centre, Australian Reptile Park, a small industrial area near the Kariong Interchange, two juvenile justice centres, and a primary school are features of Somersby. Old Sydney Town, now defunct, was a popular tourist destination in Somersby.

Heritage listings
Somersby has a number of heritage-listed sites, including:
 Pacific Highway: Mount Penang Juvenile Justice Centre

Places of Worship
St Francis of Assisi Catholic Church

Gallery

See also 
 Holt-Bragg Bridge

References

Suburbs of the Central Coast (New South Wales)
Central Coast Council (New South Wales)